The Wakka Wakka language, also spelt Waga, or Wakawaka, is an extinct Pama–Nyungan language formerly spoken by the Wakka Wakka people, an Aboriginal Australian nation near Brisbane, Australia.

Kaiabara/Gayabara, Nguwera/Ngoera, and Buyibara may be varieties or alternative names.

References

 

Waka–Kabic languages
Extinct languages of Queensland
Extinct languages